Stuart Black (born June 2, 1975) is a Nigerian-born Canadian former soccer player who began his career in the Canadian National Soccer League, and finished off his career in the USL A-League, and the Canadian Professional Soccer League.

Playing career 
Black began his career with Toronto Supra of the Canadian National Soccer League in 1996. He helped Supra finish with a third-place finish in the league standings, and secured a playoff position. Their opponents were St. Catharines Wolves in the semi-finals, but were eliminated from the completion with a 2-1 defeat on goals on aggregate. In 1999, he signed with Detroit Rockers of the National Professional Soccer League, where he would have a three-year term and finished with 51 appearances and six goals to his name. In 1999, during the outdoor season he signed with Toronto Lynx of the USL A-League.

In 2001, Black signed with York Region Shooters of the Canadian Professional Soccer League. His next stint in the CPSL was in 2005 when he signed with the Vaughan Shooters. He made his debut for Vaughan on May 29, 2005 in a match against Toronto Croatia. He helped Vaughan secure a division title by finishing first in the Eastern Conference. In the postseason he helped Vaughan reach the CPSL Championship finals, where they faced the Oakville Blue Devils lost to a score of 2-1.

References 

Living people
Canadian soccer players
Canadian Soccer League (1998–present) players
Detroit Rockers players
SC Toronto players
Toronto Lynx players
National Professional Soccer League (1984–2001) players
A-League (1995–2004) players
Canadian National Soccer League players
York Region Shooters players
1975 births
Association football defenders